Osvald Käpp (17 February 1905 – 22 December 1995) was an Estonian wrestler who competed in freestyle and Greco-Roman lightweight events at the 1924, 1928 and 1932 Summer Olympics. He won the freestyle contest in 1928 and served as the Olympic flag bearer for Estonia in 1932. He also won two medals in Greco-Roman wrestling at the European championships in 1926–27.

Käpp trained as a gymnast and basketball player before changing to wrestling in 1923. In 1929, during the Great Depression, he immigrated to New York City, and won the AAU Greco-Roman (1929) and freestyle titles (1930–31). He retired in 1931, but was convinced to compete in the 1932 Summer Olympics, as Estonia could not afford sending an Olympic team to Los Angeles and was recruiting Estonians living in the United States (only Käpp and Alfred Maasik agreed). Lack of preparation took its toll, and Käpp was eliminated after three rounds in both freestyle and Greco-Roman wrestling.

Käpp was a pastry-chef. While living in Tallinn he worked at a candy factory and later opened a bakery in New York.

References

External links
 

1905 births
1995 deaths
Sportspeople from Tallinn
People from the Governorate of Estonia
Estonian male sport wrestlers
Olympic wrestlers of Estonia
Wrestlers at the 1924 Summer Olympics
Wrestlers at the 1928 Summer Olympics
Wrestlers at the 1932 Summer Olympics
Olympic gold medalists for Estonia
Olympic medalists in wrestling
Medalists at the 1928 Summer Olympics
European Wrestling Championships medalists
Estonian emigrants to the United States
20th-century Estonian people